The ruby fluorescence pressure scale is an optical method to measure pressure within a sample chamber of a diamond anvil cell apparatus. Since it is an optical method, which fully make use of the transparency of diamond anvils and only requires an access to a small scale laser generator, it has become the most prevalent pressure gauge method in high pressure sciences.

Principles 
Ruby is chromium-dopped corundum (Al2O3). The Cr3+ in corundum lattice formed an octahedra with surrounding oxygen ions. The octahedral crystal field together with spin-orbital interaction results in different energy levels. Once 3d electrons in Cr3+ is energized by lasers, the excited electrons would go to 4T2 and 2T2 levels. Later they will return to 2E levels and the R1, R2 lines come from luminescence from 2E levels to 4A2 ground level. The energy difference of 2E levels are 29 cm−1, corresponding to the splitting of R1, R2 lines 1.39 nm.

Development 
Ruby fluorescence spectra has two strong sharp lines, R1 and R2. R1 refers to the stronger intensity and lower energy (longer wavelength) excitation and is used to gauge pressure.

Pressure is calculated as: , where λ0 is the R1 wavelength measured measured at 1atm, a and b are constants. (e.g. a = 1904, b = 5)

Since first demonstrated by Forman and colleagues in 1972, many scientists have contributed to the establishment of accurate ruby pressure scale in various experimental conditions.

A likely incomplete summary of is given below:

References 

High pressure science
Optics
Applied and interdisciplinary physics